This is a list of the dukes and princes of Benevento.

Dukes of Benevento

 571–591 Zotto
 591–641 Arechis I
 641–642 Aiulf I
 642–647 Radoald
 647–662 Grimoald I (then King of the Lombards, 662–671)
 662–687 Romoald I
 687–689 Grimoald II
 689–706 Gisulf I
 706–730 Romoald II
 730–732 Audelais
 733–739 Gregory
 739–742 Godescalc
 742–751 Gisulf II
 751–758 Liutprand
 758–774 Arechis II (tried to become king in 774)

Princes of Benevento
Also princes of Capua from 900 to 981. 

 774–787 Arechis II (independent of any royal authority)
 787–806 Grimoald III
 806–817 Grimoald IV
 817–832 Sico I
 832–839 Sicard
 839–851 Radelchis I
 851–854 Radelgar
 854–878 Adelchis
 878–881 Waifer
 881–884 Radelchis II (deposed)
 884–890 Aiulf II
 890–891 Orso
 891–895 To the Byzantines.
 895–897 Guy (also Duke of Spoleto d.898)
 897 Peter, Bishop of Benevento, as regent
 897–900 Radelchis II (restored)

House of Capua
 900–910 Atenulf I the Great
 901–910 Landulf I Antipater, co-ruler
 910–943 Landulf I Antipater, co-ruled from 901 (see directly above)
 911–940 Atenulf II, co-ruler
 940 Landulf, co-ruler
 933–943 Atenulf III Carinola, co-ruler
 940–943 Landulf II the Red, co-ruler (perhaps from 939)
 943–961 Landulf II the Red, co-ruled from 940 (see above)
 943–961 Pandulf I Ironhead, co-ruler
 959–961 Landulf III, co-ruler 
 961–968 Landulf III, co-ruling with his brother (perhaps to 969, see directly below), also co-ruled from 959 (see directly above)
 961–981 Pandulf I Ironhead, co-ruling with his brother (see directly above), also co-ruled from 943 (see above), also duke of Spoleto (from 967), Salerno (from 978), and Capua (from 961) 
 968–981 Landulf IV, co-ruler, briefly sole duke in 981, then duke of Capua (d.993)
 981–1014 Pandulf II 
 987–1014 Landulf V, co-ruler
 1014–1033 Landulf V, co-ruled from 987 (see directly above, d.1053)
 1012–1033 Pandulf III, co-ruler (d.1059)
 1033–1050 Pandulf III, co-ruled from 1012 (see directly above, d.1060)
 1038–1050 Landulf VI, co-ruler (d.1077)

In 1050, the Lombard co-princes were expelled from the city by the discontented citizenry. In 1051, the city was given to the pope. In 1053, the Normans who had occupied the duchy itself since 1047 (when the Emperor Henry III gave permission to Humphrey of Hauteville) ceded it to the Pope with whom they had recently made a truce.

Princes of Benevento under Papal Suzerainty
The pope appointed his own rector, but the citizens invited the old princes back and, by 1055, they were ruling again; as vassals of the pope, however. 

 1053–1054 Rudolf, rector
 1054–1059 Pandulf III (again) 
 1054–1077 Landulf VI, co-ruled from 1038 
 1056–1074 Pandulf IV

Norman Prince of Benevento

 1078–1081 Robert Guiscard

Guiscard returned it to the Pope, but no new Beneventan prince or dukes were named until the 19th century.

Prince of Benevento under Napoleon

 1806–1815 Charles Maurice de Talleyrand-Périgord

References

Sources
Grierson, Philip and Mark Blackburn, edd. Medieval European Coinage, 1: The Early Middle Ages (5th–10th Centuries). Cambridge: Cambridge University Press, 1986.
Hallenbeck, Jan T. "Pavia and Rome: The Lombard Monarchy and the Papacy in the Eighth Century". Transactions of the American Philosophical Society, New Series, 72, 4 (1982): 1–186.
Wickham, Chris. Early Medieval Italy: Central Power and Local Society, 400–1000. London: Macmillan, 1981.

Benevento

Benevento